The Illustrated Police News was a weekly illustrated newspaper which was one of the earliest British tabloids. It featured sensational and melodramatic reports and illustrations of murders and hangings and was a direct descendant of the execution broadsheets of the 18th century.

History

The Illustrated Police News, first published in 1864, was inspired by The Illustrated London News, which had been launched in 1842 and revealed that newspapers with illustrations could achieve high sales.

Its standards of illustration and tone were reminiscent of an earlier publication, The Newgate Calendar, and the popular "penny dreadfuls". It gained a reputation for sensationalism during the Jack the Ripper murders of 1888.

Around the turn of the 20th century The Illustrated Police News ran numerous articles dealing with the "alien immigration question" that promoted xenophobic attitudes and paranoia amongst its mostly working-class readership.

The Illustrated Police News ceased publication in 1938.

In popular culture
The 2011 film Sherlock Holmes: A Game of Shadows includes scenes in which characters are reading copies of The Illustrated Police News.

Notes

References

External links

Publications established in 1864
Publications disestablished in 1938
Defunct newspapers published in the United Kingdom
Weekly newspapers published in the United Kingdom
1864 establishments in the United Kingdom